Lionel Van Brabant (24 June 1926 – 3 July 2004) was a Belgian cyclist. He finished in eighth place in the 1951 Paris–Roubaix.

References

1926 births
2004 deaths
Belgian male cyclists
People from Zwevegem
Cyclists from West Flanders